Khorazm Region (خارەزم ۋىلايەتى), is a viloyat (region) of Uzbekistan located in the northwest of the country in the lower reaches of the Amu Darya River. It borders with Turkmenistan, Karakalpakstan, and Bukhara Region. The population is estimated 1,893,300 (2021), with 67% living in rural areas. The capital is Urgench (pop. est. 145,000). Other major towns include Xonqa, Khiva, Shovot, and Pitnak.

The climate is a typically arid continental climate, with cold winters and extremely hot, dry summers.

The city of Khiva in Khorezm Region is a UNESCO World Heritage Site with world-famous architectural monuments, making Khiva one of the main centers for international tourism in the country.

The economy of Khorezm Region is primarily based on cotton.  Cotton is by far the main crop, although rice production has increased significantly in the last several years. (though the Uzbek government discourages rice production near to deserts, over water usage concerns) There are also many orchards and vineyards, melon and gourd plantations and potato fields. Khorezm Region is famous for its "gurvak" melon in Uzbekistan. 
Industry is also heavily oriented to cotton, with cotton refining, cottonseed oil extraction and textiles predominating. Khorezm is a place where many famous scholars were born, such as Abu Rayhan Biruni and al-Khwārizmī. The region has a well-developed transportation infrastructure, with over 130 km of railways and 2000 km of surfaced roads. The region is connected by rail to European Russia and the Caucasus.

Administrative divisions

The Xorazm Region consists of 11 districts (listed below) and two district-level cities: Urgench and Khiva.

There are 3 cities (Urgench, Khiva, Pitnak) and 56 urban-type settlements in the Xorazm Region. In March 2020 the new Tuproqqalʼa District was created out of the larger, eastern part of Hazorasp District.

See also
Khwarazm
Khwarezmian language

References

 
Regions of Uzbekistan